Menota Tekah is a Trinidadian former cricketer who played as a right-handed batter. She appeared in six One Day Internationals for Trinidad and Tobago at the 1973 World Cup and five Test matches for the West Indies in 1976. In all, she scored 57 Test runs and 28 ODI runs. She also played domestic cricket for Trinidad and Tobago.

References

External links
 
 

Living people
Date of birth missing (living people)
Year of birth missing (living people)
West Indian women cricketers
West Indies women Test cricketers
Trinidad and Tobago women cricketers